The T93 (Type 93) Sniper Rifle is a 7.62×51mm bolt-action rifle designed and manufactured in Taiwan.

History
It was first shown to the public during the 2007 Taipei Aerospace & Defense Technology Exhibition.  The primary organization responsible for the development of this rifle is the 205th Armory, with technical assistance from unspecified domestic and foreign firms.

Design
By its appearance, the T93 is closely patterned after the M24 Sniper Weapon System.  It features a similar action with internal magazine.  The barrel is floated for its entire length.  One notable
departure from the M24 design is the absence of the front sight base.
The adjustable-length stock appears to be H-S Precision PST-25, but is said to have been redesigned using ergonomic measurements of Taiwanese soldiers.

As displayed, the T93 prototype is equipped with a Leupold Ultra M3A riflescope on an extended Picatinny rail mount, allowing the use of night-vision equipment with the scope.  The scope mount is similar to the McCann Industries MIRS, but lacks rails on either side.  The bipod is a Harris Ultralight 1A2 Series.

According to official news release, T93 scored a best 3-round group size of 0.3 MOA at 800 meters during trials.  It was not known whether factory match or hand-loaded ammunition was used.  The rifle also passed endurance tests by firing 6,000 rounds without any failure.

Production and Usage
Potential customers are scout sniper and special operations/anti-terrorism units in the military, as well as police SWAT units.

In September 2008, the Republic of China Marine Corps announced it will procure 179 T93 rifles and over 100,000 rounds of sniper ammunition over the next two years.  One hundred thirty-two rifles and 74,000 rounds of ammunition will be delivered in 2009, while the remaining 47 rifles and 26,000 rounds of ammunition will be delivered in 2010.  Total procurement cost is approximately NT$120M (US$3.8M).

See also
 Sniper rifle/Anti-Materiel Rifle (AMR)
 Sako TRG-22 (.308 Winchester)
 Accuracy International L115A3 AWM (.338 Lapua Magnum)
 McMillan Tac-50 (.50 BMG [12.7×99mm])
 Denel NTW-20 (14.5mm and 20mm)
 JS 7.62 (7.62×54mmR)
 Orsis T-5000 (.338 Lapua Magnum)
 Zijiang M99 (12.7×108mm)
 PTRS-41 (14.5×114mm)

References

7.62×51mm NATO rifles
Bolt-action rifles
Sniper rifles
Firearms of the Republic of China
Military equipment introduced in the 2000s